Since 1887, 224 Notre Dame Fighting Irish football players have earned the distinction of team captain.

Dr. Henry Luhn established the role of football captain in 1887, followed by the first two-year captain in Ed Prudhomme.

There are twenty-four players who have earned the distinction of captain twice: Edward Prudhomme (1888–89); Frank Keough (1893-94); Louis "Red" Salmon (1902–03); Leonard Bahan (1918–19); Pat Filley (1943–44); Bob Olson (1968–69); Willie Fry (1976–77); Bob Crable (1980–81); Phil Carter (1981–82); Ned Bolcar (1988–89); Ryan Leahy (1994–95); Ron Powlus (1996–97); Grant Irons (2000–01); Brady Quinn (2005-06); Tom Zbikowski (2006–07); Travis Thomas (2006-07); Maurice Crum, Jr. (2007–08); Zack Martin (2012–13); Sheldon Day (2014–15); Nick Martin (2014-15); Mike McGlinchey (2016–17); Drue Tranquil (2017–18); Ian Book (2019–20); Robert Hainsey (2019-20)

Jack Mullen is the only Notre Dame player to be chosen as team captain three times, leading the Fighting Irish from 1897 through the 1899 season.

The first duo-captains were Gene Edwards and Tom Heardon during the 1926 season, and the first trio was chosen in 1973 with Dave Casper, Frank Pomarico and Mike Townsend.  The number of captains per season has increased steadily since the 1967 season, and the current record was seven in 2019.  The last solo captain was Harrison Smith in 2011.

Four captains would eventually become head coaches for the Fighting Irish football team.  These men were Frank Hering (1896–98), Red Salmon (1904), Knute Rockne (1918–30), and Hugh Devore (1945, 1963).

Many of the captains have also received other honors during their collegiate careers.  The list includes at least seventy-seven players who were selected to All-America teams, twenty-five consensus All-Americans, and seven that were selected unanimously.  Nineteen have been enshrined in the College Football Hall of Fame.  A collection of other awards, the Lombardi (5), Maxwell (4), UPI Lineman of the year (4), Outland (3), Unitas (2), SN Player of the Year, Jim Parker, Sammy Baugh, John Mackay, Bronko Nagurski, Lott, Butkus, Bednarick, Walter Camp, and Wuerffel have also been won at least once.

Nine captains have been finalists for the Heisman Trophy a combined eleven times, including Allen Pinkett in 1983 (16th), Walt Patulski in 1971 (9th), Ian Book in 2020 (9th), Allen Pinkett in 1985 (8th), Frank Dancewicz in 1945 (6th), Ross Browner in 1977 (5th), Vagas Ferguson in 1979 (5th), Tom Clements in 1974 (4th), Tony Rice in 1989 (4th), Brady Quinn in 2005 (4th) and 2006 (3rd), and Manti T'eo in 2012 (2nd).  Leon Hart finished atop the rankings in 1949 and became the only captain to win the Heisman.

There were at least four captains who were chosen by their peers to represent the Fighting Irish in the next football season, but were unable to perform their duty for a variety of reasons.  Bill Walsh was elected to the distinction in 1896 after leading the Irish as starting quarterback in the previous season, but turned it down to enter Georgetown Law School.  George Gipp was originally elected to be captain of the football team in 1920, but Knute Rockne suspended him in March because of what he stated as missing too many classes, while other reports speculated that he had been caught at an off-limits nightclub.  In March 1935, captain-elect Joe Sullivan died of pneumonia, and as a result no captain acting in any capacity represented the Irish on the field that season. Moreover, an award in his name was donated by the Notre Dame club of New York to the interhall football program to serve as their season's championship trophy. Bill Smith was intended to become captain of the 1936 team, but was forced to drop football after a doctor deemed him unfit to play, with John Lautar filling his place as an acting captain.  Of the four, Bill Smith and Joe Sullivan are the only two who are given recognition on the official list of Notre Dame captains, although a footnote below each season explains their unique circumstances.

Game-by-game captains 
No permanent captains were selected during the 1946 and 2010 seasons.  Head coaches Frank Leahy (1946) and Brian Kelly (2010) chose a new captain for each game in their respective seasons.  Game-by-game captains were also chosen during the 2002 season under Tyrone Willingham, but four permanent captains were eventually selected at the end of the season.

References 

Notre Dame Fighting Irish
Notre Dame Fighting Irish football captains